The Lari massacre was an incident during the Mau Mau Uprising in which the Mau Mau massacred 97 people, including some members of the loyalist Home Guard, but mostly their families: women, children and elderly relatives.  Those murdered included prominent local loyalist Luka Kangara.

The colonial government used the attack as propaganda and showed the massacre to journalists. The massacre prompted retaliatory attacks. 400 Mau Mau were reputedly killed by colonial troops, including the King's African Rifles, in revenge.

References

External links
 Lari Massacre Trial at British Pathe

1953 in Kenya
Conflicts in 1953
Mass murder in 1953
Massacres in Kenya
Mau Mau Uprising
March 1953 events in Africa
Massacres in 1953